State Highway 26 (SH 26) is a Texas state highway located completely within Tarrant County. SH 26 was designated on July 2, 1917. SH 26 terminates at Texas State Highway 183 and Texas State Highway 121. SH 26 was redesignated  from its original location in East Texas to its current location in Tarrant County on April 4, 1980. SH 26 was the last of the original 26 state highways proposed in 1917.

Route description

History

 SH 26 designated on July 2, 1917 as a short route from Tyler through Henderson to Nacogdoches. On January 19, 1920, the section of SH 26 from Tyler to Henderson was cancelled, and SH 26 was instead rerouted to end in Overton. On November 27, 1922, the section of SH 26 from Henderson to Overton was cancelled. On August 21, 1923, SH 26 was extended northward to Longview over part of SH 43. On February 21, 1935, SH 26 Loop was designated in Kilgore. On September 26, 1939, it had been extended north to the Oklahoma border via a proposed section of SH 149 and SH 11. SH 26 Loop was renumbered as Loop 66. On December 12, 1962, SH 26 was cancelled when U.S. Highway 259 was routed over its entire length.

On April 4, 1980, it was redesignated along the Spur 452 and the old route of SH 121 from Haltom City to I-820, then northeastward through Colleyville and Grapevine. On May 16, 1988, the section from SH 114 to BS 114-L (was Loop 382 until 1990) was cancelled. This is its current route.

SH 26A was a spur designated on October 26, 1925 from Longview to Tatum. It extended south to Carthage by 1926 over part of SH 8, which was rerouted farther east. On March 19, 1930, this was renumbered as SH 149.

SH 26B was a spur designated On April 27, 1925, from SH 35 in Timpson to SH 26 west of Timpson. On July 13, 1925, SH 26B was shortened to end in Garrison. On July 27, 1925, it was extended back to Timpson. On March 19, 1930, this became an extension of SH 22.

Major intersections

References

026
Transportation in Tarrant County, Texas
North Richland Hills, Texas